Sędziszowa  is a village in the administrative district of Gmina Bobowa, within Gorlice County, Lesser Poland Voivodeship, in southern Poland.

References

Villages in Gorlice County